The women's duet event at the 2000 Summer Olympics in Sydney, Australia, took place inside the Sydney International Aquatic Centre from 24 to 26 September.

The preliminary phase consisted of a technical routine and a free routine. The scores from the two routines were added together and the top 12 duets qualified for the final.

The final consisted of one free routine, the score from the final free routine was added to the score from the preliminary technical routine to decide the overall winners.

Schedule 
All times are Australia Standard Time (UTC+11)

Results

Qualification

Final

References

External links
Official Report of the 2000 Sydney Summer Olympics

2000
2000 in women's sport
Women's events at the 2000 Summer Olympics